Georgia V. Coleman (January 23, 1912 – September 14, 1940) was an American diver. She competed in the 3 m springboard and 10 m platform at the 1928 and 1932 Olympics and won one gold, one bronze and two silver medals. Domestically she collected 11 AAU titles.

At the 1932 Olympics, Coleman announced her engagement to the Olympic diver Mickey Riley, but the marriage was cancelled. In 1937, she contracted polio. She learned to swim again, but two years later developed pneumonia as an after effect of the polio, and died at the age of twenty-eight.

See also
 List of members of the International Swimming Hall of Fame

References

External links

profile

1912 births
1940 deaths
American female divers
Divers at the 1928 Summer Olympics
Divers at the 1932 Summer Olympics
Olympic gold medalists for the United States in diving
Olympic silver medalists for the United States in diving
Olympic bronze medalists for the United States in diving
People with polio
American people with disabilities
Medalists at the 1932 Summer Olympics
Medalists at the 1928 Summer Olympics
People from St. Maries, Idaho
20th-century American women
20th-century American people
Deaths from pneumonia in California